The 2020 Ivy League men's soccer season was to be the 66th season of the conference sponsoring men's varsity soccer. The season initially was scheduled to begin on August 28, 2020 and conclude on November 14, 2020, but has postponed to begin on February 3, 2021 and conclude on April 17, 2021.

On July 8, 2020, the Ivy League announced that no sports would be played until January 1, 2021, at the earliest, because of the COVID-19 pandemic. It has not yet been determined whether men's soccer will take place in the spring or not at all. On September 16, 2020, the NCAA announced that the season will resume on February 3, 2021.

On November 13, 2020, the Ivy League announced that spring sports, including men's soccer, will be cancelled, making it the first year since 1954 that men's soccer will not be played.

Yale were going to enter the season as the defending champions.

Background

Previous season 

The 2019 season was the conference's 65th season sponsoring men's varsity soccer. Yale won the Ivy League championship with a 6–1–0 conference record, at one point being ranked as high as 24th in the nation. In the first round, Princeton played Boston College, where they were defeated 0–3.

Coaching changes 
Following the conclusion of the 2019 season, Harvard head coach, Pieter Lehrer, was fired. Lehrer was replaced by Josh Shapiro on January 13, 2020.

Head coaches

MLS SuperDraft 

The MLS SuperDraft was held on January 21, 2021 and we held virtually through its website. One player from the Ivy League was selected in the draft.

Total picks by school

List of selections

Notable undrafted players 
The following are notable players who went pro following the end of the season that were not selected in the 2021 MLS SuperDraft.

Homegrown players 

The Homegrown Player Rule is a Major League Soccer program that allows MLS teams to sign local players from their own development academies directly to MLS first team rosters. Before the creation of the rule in 2008, every player entering Major League Soccer had to be assigned through one of the existing MLS player allocation processes, such as the MLS SuperDraft.

To place a player on its homegrown player list, making him eligible to sign as a homegrown player, players must have resided in that club's home territory and participated in the club's youth development system for at least one year. Players can play college soccer and still be eligible to sign a homegrown contract.

References

External links 
 Ivy League Men's Soccer

 
2020 NCAA Division I men's soccer season
Association football events postponed due to the COVID-19 pandemic